is a Japanese singer. In 1991, she became a member of Sakurakko Club, together with Anza Oyama, Miki Nakatani, Miho Kanno, and Noriko Katō.

References

External links
 Official blog

1974 births
Japanese women pop singers
Living people
Musicians from Niigata Prefecture
Musicians from Saitama Prefecture
20th-century Japanese women singers
20th-century Japanese singers
21st-century Japanese women singers
21st-century Japanese singers